The 1995 Rijeka bombing occurred on 20 October 1995 in Rijeka, Croatia, when an Islamic terrorist organization attempted to destroy a police station by driving a car with a bomb into the wall of the building. Twenty-seven employees in the police station and two bystanders on the street were injured, although the only person killed was the attacker.

Background 
In the last days of the Bosnian War, the Croatian Defense Council (HVO), a Bosnian Croat military force, captured Tal'at Fu'ad Qasim when he attempted to enter Bosnia and Herzegovina. Qasim, an important member of al-Gama'a al-Islamiyya, was soon transferred to Egypt with the active help of Croatia. Because of that and because Croatia had de facto controlled the Croatian Defence Council, the military organization which had captured Tal'at Fu'ad Qasim, a decision was made to commit a terrorist attack in Croatia.

Attack 

At 11:21 a.m. Central European Time, a Fiat 131 Mirafiori entered the parking lot of the Primorje-Gorski Kotar County police headquarters. Due to the 90-degree turn needed to enter the lot, the vehicle moved slowly. Near the entrance, the driver did not park in the parking spaces for civilians, but instead started to accelerate towards the wall at the end of the parking lot. Due to the low security measures, this incident was not noticed before the attack itself took place. After 15–20 meters, passing 8-10 available parking spaces in the small lot, the Fiat crashed into the stairs leading to the police station and exploded. The time of explosion was recorded as 11:22 a.m. local time (10:22 UTC). The police also found a part of a Canadian passport inside the remains of the attacker's car. The next day, representatives of the al-Gama'a al-Islamiyya terrorist organization from Egypt claimed responsibility for the attack, requesting extradition of Qasim.

Due to an error made by the attackers, the bombing did not cause fatalities, aside from the suicide bomber himself. The police headquarters is located on a higher ground than the parking lot itself, requiring the stairs in the first place. The other apparent miscalculation involved the size of the parking lot, where the Fiat 131 had neither the space and velocity, nor the horsepower, to climb the stairs and destroy the police station wall. As a result, the police station failed to collapse and only 29 injuries were recorded (including two unaware bystanders). The bomb also carved a large crater in the ground, battering nearby buildings and destroying vehicles.

Aftermath 

With the help of the CIA, officials examined the video footage of the attack. American and Croatian investigative sources came to the conclusion that Hassan al-Sharif Mahmud Saad had organized this attack. Saad had come to live in Bosnia only that year; previously, he had been living in Italy. Soon after the attack, Bosnian officials discovered that Saad was planning a new terrorist attack, against NATO forces, which was to happen in December 1995. A few days after that attack failed, he was killed in central Bosnia in a firefight with Croatian Defense Council forces.

See also 

 Mostar car bombing
 Hidroelektra workers massacre

References 

Explosions in 1995
October 1995 events in Europe
History of Rijeka
Terrorist incidents in Croatia
Rijeka bombing
Islamic terrorism in Croatia
Islamic terrorism in Europe
Rijeka bombing
Suicide car and truck bombings in Europe
Attacks on police stations in the 1990s
1995 crimes in Croatia
Building bombings in Europe